Jammu and Kashmir Black Day is an annual commemoration established in India by the Narendra Modi-led government on 22 October 2020 with the stated aim of highlighting Pakistan's role in the 1947 Kashmir conflict, to term it as an invasion and a "Black Day."

About 
According to Indian sources, the invasion did not start on 22 October. The first skirmish, comprising 2 JAK Infantry, took place at Owen Pattan on 8–9 October 1947. Sehnsa was attacked on 9 October, and the following days saw more skirmishes at different locations. However, 22 October is the day of observance of the invasion due to the so-called importance of the Kashmir valley, the day the Instrument of Accession was signed, and political decisions taken.

A number of awareness related events, including cultural event, have been held. In 2020 a number of panel discussions were held, with panelists including Lt Gen (Retd) Syed Ata Hasnain and Amitabh Mattoo. The Union Ministry of Culture and state government of Jammu and Kashmir mark the day with exhibitions and events. In 2020, Raiders in Kashmir, a book written by Mohammed Akbar Khan, a retired major general of Pakistan Army, was republished. Refugees also mark the day.

See also

References 

October observances
Observances in India
Kashmir conflict